Miguel Hermes Ahumada Pacheco (born 4 March 1911–28 December 2004) was a Chilean politician, lawyer and physician who served as President of the Senate of Chile.

External links
 BCN Profile

1911 births
2004 deaths
People from Rengo
Chilean people of Spanish descent
Radical Party of Chile politicians
Deputies of the XL Legislative Period of the National Congress of Chile
Deputies of the XLI Legislative Period of the National Congress of Chile
Deputies of the XLII Legislative Period of the National Congress of Chile
Deputies of the XLIII Legislative Period of the National Congress of Chile
Presidents of the Senate of Chile
Senators of the XLIV Legislative Period of the National Congress of Chile
Senators of the XLV Legislative Period of the National Congress of Chile
Chilean Freemasons
University of Chile alumni
Columbia University alumni